Kamal is a port, on Madura Island in Indonesia. It is a ferry port, and connects with Surabaya's harbour of Tanjung Perak.

References

Stephen Backshall, The Rough Guide to Indonesia p297

Ports and harbours of Indonesia
Madura Island